Hailfingen is a suburban district of Rottenburg am Neckar in the administrative district of Tübingen in Baden-Württemberg (Germany).

Geography 

Hailfingen is located 9 km (5.6 mi) northwestern from Rottenburg am Neckar and 9 km southern from Herrenberg.

Extent 

The area of the district is 751 hectares. Thereof fall 75.0% upon agriculturally used area, 13.1% upon forest area, 11.2% upon settlement area and roads and 0.7% upon other.

Neighbour localities 

The territories of the following villages adjoin to Hailfingen, they are called clockwise beginning in the north: Tailfingen, Reusten, Oberndorf, Seebronn and Bondorf.

Bondorf and Tailfingen are in the administrative district of Böblingen, the other villages are in the administrative district of Tübingen. The villages Oberndorf and Seebronn are also suburbs of Rottenburg. Bondorf is an independent municipality. Tailfingen belongs to the municipality of Gäufelden and Reusten is a part of the municipality of Ammerbuch.

Population 

Hailfingen has 1581 residents (31/01/08). At an area of 7.51 km² (2.9 sq mi) this corresponds to a population density of 211 people per km², or 545 per sq mi.

Faiths 

About 50 percent of the population is Roman Catholic.

References

External links 
 Official Webpage (German)

Rottenburg am Neckar